Kiana is a Finnish melodic death metal band from Hyvinkää, Finland.

History
Wellu Koskinen (drums) and Antti Kilpi (guitars) formed the band in 2004; Jarno Suodenjoki (guitars, backing vocals) joined the band later that year. Jani Hytönen (vocals) and Oskari Nyman (bass) completed the group in 2005. They self-released their first demo, Deep Inside, in 2005 with an EP, Reflections, following in 2006. Their debut album, Abstract Entity was released on Symbolic Records on 1 September 2009.

Discography
Demos and EPs
Deep Inside (Demo, 2005)
Reflections (EP, 2006)Studio albums
Abstract Entity (2009)

Members
Antti Kilpi - guitars
Jarno Suodenjoki - guitars, backing vocals
Felipe Muñóz - keyboards
Jani Hytönen - vocals
Oskari Nyman - bass
Wellu Koskinen - drums

References

Metal Encyclopedia

External links
Official Facebook Page
Official Myspace Page
Kiana on Metal Storm
Kiana's Last.fm Page
Metal Encyclopedia

Finnish melodic death metal musical groups
Musical groups established in 2004